The Women's 100m butterfly event at the 2010 South American Games was held on March 26, with the heats at 10:49 and the Final at 18:32.

Medalists

Records

Results

Heats

Final

References
Heats
Final

Butterfly 100m W